Big Mother Gig is an indie rock band originally founded in Milwaukee, Wisconsin and currently based in Los Angeles, CA, by Richard Jankovich.

While attending Marquette University in Milwaukee in the 1990s, Richard Jankovich formed Big Mother Gig with Rob Due, Jason Borkowicz and Charles Watson. In 1993, they released "My Social Commentary." In 1994, Rob Due was replaced by Riz Rashid and they released "Transition EP." Borkowicz and Watson left in 1995 and were ultimately replaced by Brady Roehl (drums) and Matt Deede (bass.) In 1996, Big Mother Gig released "Smiling Politely" and broke up when Jankovich moved to New York City. From 1992 to 1996, Big Mother Gig played over 150 concerts around the Midwest. Other prior members include Joe Neumann and Brian Rutkowski.

In 2016, Big Mother Gig released their discography digitally for the first time and announced a new EP as well as a reunion show in Milwaukee featuring 3/4s of the classic 1996 line-up. Almost Primed, their first new music in over 20 years, was released in March 2017. The band, now based in Los Angeles with Jankovich, Mike Datz (guitar), Micah Lopez (bass) and Albert Kurniawan (drums), continued to drop a series of singles through 2017 and 2018 including "Nametag", "The Great Heist", "(Let's Make) Compelling Content", and "Obliterate". On October 12, 2018, they released "No More Questions" which collected tracks from the EP, the singles they had released throughout 2018 and brand new songs including "Low Payout" featuring Dicky Barrett (The Mighty Mighty Bosstones) and "Our Cover's Blown" featuring Britta Phillips (Luna) and co-written with author Rick Moody.

Their post-reunion work has been praised by Alternative Press, Paste, Under The Radar, New Noise, Impose, AllThingsGo, Substream, and PureGrainAudio. "(Let's Make) Compelling Content" was Song Of The Day on NPR/The Current and appeared twice on the Submodern Radio Chart. The music video for "Obliterate" stars Michael Ornstein from Sons Of Anarchy. Their recent recordings were recorded with Jeff Hamilton (Violent Femmes) and Dan Long (Spiral Stairs), and mastered by Kramer. Now based in Los Angeles, Big Mother Gig has played shows around the Midwest and California with Luna, Soccer Mommy, Gin Blossoms, Peelander-Z, and many more.

In February 2021, Big Mother Gig announced their new LP Gusto on Stereogum and released the first single, "The Underdog" featuring Leah Wellbaum of Slothrust. Second single, "The Doctor Will See You Now" was released on March 17. Gusto was released on April 30, 2021 to positive reviews by Stereogum, NPR, American Songwriter, BrooklynVegan and more. In the Fall of 2021, the band supported the album with a 3 week US tour opening for Black Joe Lewis & the Honeybears.

In January 2023, "The Underdog" was featured in episode 511 of The Rookie on ABC.

Discography 
 1993: My Social Commentary (LP)
 1994: Transition (EP)
 1996: Smiling Politely (LP)
 2016: Quintessentially Average: 92-96 (LP)
 2017: Almost Primed (EP)
 2018: No More Questions (LP)
 2021: Gusto (LP)

References

External links
 Official website
 Fraga Sweet Sweet website

Alternative rock groups from Wisconsin
Musical groups established in 1992
Musical groups disestablished in 1996
Musical groups reestablished in 2016